There have been several military hospitals operated by the Royal Air Force of the United Kingdom and carrying the designation RAF Hospital:

 RAF Hospital Cosford, Shropshire (1940 – 1977)
 RAF Hospital Ely, Cambridgeshire (1940 – 1992)
 RAF Hospital Nocton Hall, Lincolnshire
 RAF Hospital Northallerton, North Yorkshire (1943 – 1947)
 RAF Hospital Middle East (Cairo, March 1943 – March 1947)
 RAF Hospital Torquay, Devon (1939 – 1942)
 RAF Hospital Uxbridge, then in Middlesex
 RAF Hospital Wegberg, near Mönchengladbach, Germany
 RAF Princess Alexandra Hospital, near Wroughton, Wiltshire
 The Princess Mary's Hospital, RAF Akrotiri, Cyprus
 Princess Mary's RAF Hospital, RAF Halton, Buckinghamshire

Military hospitals in the United Kingdom
Hospital